The Schneckenstein is 23-metre-high rock formation near the village of the same name in Saxony, southeastern Germany. Its summit is 883 metres above sea level.

Rock formations of Saxony